Benjamin Giraud (born 23 January 1986 in Marseille) is a French former cyclist, who competed professionally for the  team between 2011 and 2017. Since 2020, Giraud now works as a directeur sportif for the  team.

Major results

2009
 3rd Paris–Mantes-en-Yvelines
 3rd Grand Prix de Bavay
2010
 1st Stage 5 Tour de Franche-Comté
 3rd Emirates Cup
2011
 1st Stage 3 Circuit des Ardennes
 3rd Cholet-Pays de Loire
2012
 1st Grand Prix Souvenir Jean-Masse
 10th Grand Prix de la Somme
2013
 1st Stage 6 Tour de Taiwan
 1st Stage 10 Tour of Qinghai Lake
 2nd La Roue Tourangelle
 4th Val d'Ille Classic
 8th Châteauroux Classic
 9th Overall Tour of China I
1st Points classification
1st Stages 2 & 5
 10th Overall Tour de Picardie
 10th Grand Prix de Denain
2014
 1st Stage 2 Tour de Taiwan
 4th Grand Prix de la Somme
 5th Grand Prix de Fourmies
 6th Châteauroux Classic
 8th Grand Prix de Denain
2015
 1st Stage 5 Tour of Hainan
 1st Stage 3 (TTT) Circuit des Ardennes
 4th Classica Corsica
 5th Route Adélie
 5th La Roue Tourangelle
 9th Grand Prix La Marseillaise
2016
 9th Route Adélie
2017
 3rd Tro-Bro Léon
 10th Grand Prix de Denain
 10th Primus Classic

References

External links

1986 births
Living people
French male cyclists
Directeur sportifs
Cyclists from Marseille